Waka P'iqi (Aymara waka cow, p'iqi, p'iq'iña, phiq'i, phiq'iña  head, "cow head", also spelled Huaca Pekhe) is a  mountain in the Bolivian Andes. It is located in the Cochabamba Department, Ayopaya Province, Cocapata Municipality, west of the village of Chorito. Wak'a P'iqi lies at the left bank of the Jatun Mayu ("big river").

References 

Mountains of Cochabamba Department